Adolf Hafner (born 5 January 1926) is an Austrian former ice hockey player who competed in the 1956 Winter Olympics.

References

1926 births
Living people
Ice hockey players at the 1956 Winter Olympics
Olympic ice hockey players of Austria
Place of birth missing (living people)